Polyradiculoneuropathy describes a condition in which polyneuropathy and polyradiculopathy occur together. An example is Guillain–Barré syndrome.

Treatment with a single course of intravenous immunoglobulin (IVIG) infusions has been demonstrated to be a potentially effective treatment (reported to have caused prolonged remission in a case associated with systemic lupus (Systemic lupus erythematosus) ).

References

External links 

 

Nerve, nerve root and plexus disorders